Alonso Ramírez Vergara, O.S.  (died 19 November 1602) was a Roman Catholic prelate who served as Bishop of La Plata o Charcas (1594–1602).

Biography
Alonso Ramírez Vergara was ordained a priest in the Order of Santiago.
On 17 June 1594, he was appointed during the papacy of Pope Clement VIII as Bishop of La Plata o Charcas.
In 1595, he was consecrated bishop by Toribio Alfonso de Mogrovejo, Archbishop of Lima.
He served as Bishop of La Plata o Charcas until his death on 19 November 1602.

References

External links and additional sources
 (for Chronology of Bishops) 
 (for Chronology of Bishops) 

16th-century Roman Catholic bishops in Bolivia
17th-century Roman Catholic bishops in Bolivia
Bishops appointed by Pope Clement VIII
1602 deaths
Roman Catholic bishops of Sucre